Raymond Grassi (born February 11, 1983) is a Canadian former ice sledge hockey player. He won a gold medal with Team Canada at the 2006 Winter Paralympics. He also played in the 2010 Winter Paralympics.
He is married with two children. After retiring, he has since become a teacher.

References

External links 
 

1983 births
Living people
Canadian sledge hockey players
Paralympic sledge hockey players of Canada
Paralympic gold medalists for Canada
Ice sledge hockey players at the 2006 Winter Paralympics
Medalists at the 2006 Winter Paralympics
Sportspeople from Windsor, Ontario
Paralympic medalists in sledge hockey
21st-century Canadian people